Karrabin railway station is located on the Main line in Queensland, Australia. It serves the Ipswich suburb of Karrabin.

Services
Karrabin is served by City network services from Rosewood to Ipswich. Most services terminate at Ipswich although some peak-hour services continue to Bowen Hills and Caboolture.

Services by platform

References

External links

Karrabin station Queensland Rail
Karrabin station Queensland's Railways on the Internet
[ Karrabin station] TransLink travel information

Railway stations in Ipswich City
Main Line railway, Queensland